The Steyr 50 is a small car released in 1936 by the Austrian automobile manufacturer Steyr-Daimler-Puch AG.

Design
The streamlined body was approved by Director Karl Jenschke to be constructed in 1935, however, in November of that same year Jenschke was employed as chief designer by the German Adler manufacturer in Frankfurt/Main. It was officially presented to the public at the 1936 Berlin Motor Show.

The car had a water-cooled four-cylinder boxer engine with thermosiphon cooling, driving the rear wheels through a four-speed transmission.  To save room and weight, a dynastarter was used, which doubled as the axle of the radiator fan. It was regarded as the "Austrian Volkswagen" and was affectionately referred to as Steyr "Baby". The Volkswagen constructor Ferdinand Porsche had, despite rumors, not been involved in the design or production of the 50, nor was Hans Ledwinka, who had designed the Tatra V570. The little Steyr offered better seating and luggage space than Porsche's Volkswagen with shorter overall length, a large sheet metal sliding roof, and hydraulic brakes (instead of the early Volkswagens' cable-operated ones).

In early 1938, the car was revised. It got a more powerful engine and a longer wheelbase. The new model was called the Steyr 55 and went on sale until production ceased in 1940.

A total of 13,000 "Steyr-Babys" were sold.

Other Steyr models included the Steyr 100 and Steyr 120, both equipped with straight-4 engines, as well as the flagship Steyr 220 with a 2.2 litre straight-6 producing . All these models were produced as cabriolets as well. The production of Steyr cars was discontinued during World War II, after bombing of the facilities in Steyr. 

After the war, the factory was rebuilt and from 1953 specialized in the Austrian versions of the Fiat 1400 and 1900 models (Steyr 2000). Starting in 1957, the company also produced the Puch 500, based on the Fiat 500. Today the Steyr factory produces the BMW X models for Europe.

References
 Oswald, Werner: Deutsche Autos 1920-1945, Motorbuch Verlag Stuttgart, 10. Auflage (1996), 
 Rauscher, Karl-Heinz und Knogler, Franz: Das Steyr-Baby und seine Verwandten, Weishaupt Verlag, A-8342 Gnas, 1. Auflage (2002),

External links

 Die Seite für Steyr 50 und 55
 Steyr Oldtimer PKW Register

Steyr-Puch vehicles
Cars powered by boxer engines
1930s cars
Cars introduced in 1936
Rear-engined vehicles